The 1994 European Espoirs Wrestling Championships was the 12th edition of European Espoirs Wrestling Championships were held in the men's Freestyle style in Kourtane Finland 4 – 5 August 1994; the Greco-Roman style in Istanbul Turkey 27 – 28 July 1994. It was the last tournament named of Espoirs.

Medal table

Medal summary

Men's freestyle

Men's Greco-Roman

References

External links 
 Database

Wrestling
European Espoirs Wrestling Championships
W
W
Euro
Euro
Sports competitions in Istanbul